Nicholas Taylor (born November 12, 1979) is an American wheelchair tennis player. Nick started playing tennis at the age of 14. He has played 5 times in the Australian Open and 7 times in the US Open (tennis). He has a total of 11 grand slam quad doubles titles, all of them won with partner David Wagner. Taylor and Wagner are the most successful partnership to ever play at the UNIQLO Wheelchair Doubles Masters. They have won the title 11 times .

Tennis career

In July 2000, Nick Taylor and Kevin Whalen won the quads doubles title at the 2000 British Open wheelchair tennis tournament, in Nottingham, Great Britain. A few months later, in October 2000, Taylor also won his first major tournament in singles, at the US Open wheelchair tennis super series event.

In early 2004, Taylor and Wagner started playing doubles together, and soon became the most dominant doubles team in the history of wheelchair tennis. Together they have won 4 Paralympic medals, 11 Doubles Masters titles, 7 US Open grand slam titles and 4 Australian Open grand slam titles.

Taylor is known for his spectacular kick-serve technique.

Personal
Taylor has a master's degree in sports management from the Wichita State University. He is also an assistant coach for the men's tennis program at Wichita State University.

References

External links
 
 
 
 
 

1979 births
Living people
American male tennis players
Wheelchair tennis players
Paralympic wheelchair tennis players of the United States
Paralympic gold medalists for the United States
Paralympic silver medalists for the United States
Paralympic bronze medalists for the United States
Medalists at the 2004 Summer Paralympics
Medalists at the 2008 Summer Paralympics
Medalists at the 2012 Summer Paralympics
Medalists at the 2016 Summer Paralympics
Wheelchair tennis players at the 2004 Summer Paralympics
Wheelchair tennis players at the 2008 Summer Paralympics
Wheelchair tennis players at the 2012 Summer Paralympics
Wheelchair tennis players at the 2016 Summer Paralympics
US Open (tennis) champions
Paralympic medalists in wheelchair tennis
Tennis people from Kansas
ITF number 1 ranked wheelchair tennis players
21st-century American people